MI-15, MI15, MI 15 or variant may refer to:

 MI15, British Military Intelligence Section 15
 Michigan's 15th congressional district
 M-15 (Michigan highway)